Dodsonville is an unincorporated community in Highland County, in the U.S. state of Ohio.

History
Dodsonville was laid out in 1839, and named after Joshua Dodson, a government surveyor.  A post office was established at Dodsonville in 1843, and remained in operation until 1906.

References

Unincorporated communities in Highland County, Ohio
Unincorporated communities in Ohio